"Lie to Me" is a song written and performed by Czech singer Mikolas Josef. The song was independently released as a digital download on 19 November 2017. It represented the Czech Republic in the Eurovision Song Contest 2018, where it qualified for the final, finishing sixth, making it the Czech Republic's best placing in the contest.

Eurovision Song Contest

On 8 January 2018, Josef was announced as one of the six competitors in the Czech national final for the Eurovision Song Contest 2018. Following the close of the voting period, Josef was announced as the winner of the jury vote on 23 January. On 29 January, it was announced that "Lie to Me" had won the national final, and would represent the Czech Republic at the Eurovision Song Contest 2018.

The song competed in the first semi-final, held on 8 May 2018 in Lisbon, Portugal. Subsequently, it became only the second Czech entry to qualify for the grand final, with Josef performing in the second half.

Track listing

Charts

Release history

References

2017 songs
2017 singles
Eurovision songs of 2018
Eurovision songs of the Czech Republic
Sony Music singles
Mikolas Josef songs